Raymond Leslie Jackson (2 December 1910 – 25 December 1968) was an Australian rules footballer who played with North Melbourne in the Victorian Football League (VFL).

Family
The son of James John Jackson (1881–1948) and Margaret Annie Jackson (1885–1969), née Sutton, Raymond Leslie Jackson was born at Stockton, New South Wales on 2 December 1910.

He married Roma Reid (1921–2014) in 1943.

Death
He died at Prince Henry's Hospital in South Melbourne on 25 December 1968.

Notes

References
 
 World War Two Nominal Roll: Private Raymond Leslie Jackson (V129030), Department of Veterans' Affairs.
 B884, V129030: World War Two Service Record: Private Raymond Leslie Jackson (V129030), National Archives of Australia.
 World War Two Nominal Roll: Leading Aircraftsman Raymond Leslie Jackson (127801), Department of Veterans' Affairs.
 A9301, 127801: World War Two Service Record: Leading Aircraftsman Raymond Leslie Jackson (127801), National Archives of Australia.

External links 

1910 births
1968 deaths
Australian rules footballers from Victoria (Australia)
North Melbourne Football Club players
Australian Army personnel of World War II
Australian Army soldiers
Royal Australian Air Force personnel of World War II
Royal Australian Air Force airmen